The year 688 BC was a year of the pre-Julian Roman calendar. In the Roman Empire, it was known as year 66 Ab urbe condita . The denomination 688 BC for this year has been used since the early medieval period, when the Anno Domini calendar era became the prevalent method in Europe for naming years.

Events 
 By place 

 Europe 
 Traditional date for the founding of Gela in Sicily by colonists from Rhodes and Crete.

 By topic 

 Sports 
 Greece's games of the 23rd Olympiad are held at Olympia; boxing is added to the Olympic Games that are more and more intended as preparation for war.

Births

Deaths

References